The 2018 season is Rosenborg's 39th consecutive year in the top flight now known as Eliteserien, their 51st season in the top flight of Norwegian football. They will participate in Eliteserien, the Cup, the 2018 Mesterfinalen and the 2018-19 UEFA Champions League, entering at the First qualifying round stage. Kåre Ingebrigtsen started the season as manager but the club decided to remove him from the job after 4 years on July 19 and made Head of the academy Rini Coolen the manager.

Squad

Transfers

Winter

In:

Out:

Summer

In:

Out:

Competitions

Eliteserien

Results summary

Results by round

Results

Table

Norwegian Cup

Final

Mesterfinalen

Champions League

Qualifying phase

UEFA Europa League

Qualifying rounds

Group stage

Club Friendlies

Squad statistics

Appearances and goals

|-
|colspan="14"|Players away from Rosenborg on loan:
|-

|-
|colspan="14"|Players who appeared for Rosenborg no longer at the club:

|}

Disciplinary record

See also
Rosenborg BK seasons

References 

2018
Rosenborg
Rosenborg
Rosenborg
Norwegian football championship-winning seasons